Dichomeris torrescens is a moth in the family Gelechiidae. It was described by Edward Meyrick in 1921. It is found in Zimbabwe.

The wingspan is about 16 mm. The forewings are ferruginous irregularly mixed with deep ferruginous, with violet iridescence. There is an angulated light ferruginous-ochreous shade from three-fourths of the costa to the dorsum before the tornus. The hindwings are light ochreous slightly tinged with ferruginous posteriorly.

References

Endemic fauna of Zimbabwe
Moths described in 1921
torrescens